The 2008–2009 season was Hereford United's 28th season in the Football League and they competed in League One, the third tier of English football. Hereford's previous season at this level was the 1977–78 season when they finished 23rd – despite having won the same division just two years previously.

Hereford reached League One on the back of two promotions in three seasons, having won the Conference play-offs in 2005–06, and finished third in League Two in 2007–08. Graham Turner was voted League Two Manager of the Year by the League Managers Association for the latter achievement and entered his 14th season at the club.

Hereford struggled in League One, and after the first 15 matches they were bottom with 9 points. For the vast majority of the season the Bulls were in the relegation zone and were relegated on 18 April after a sixth consecutive defeat – their worst form of the season. Hereford did manage to achieve the double over both Cheltenham Town and Carlisle United. Their two other notable results were a 5–0 home win over Oldham Athletic, and a 2–0 home win over Leeds United.

The top goalscorer of the season is Steve Guinan with 15 goals, all scored in the league. Guinan is the club's longest serving player with 68 goals in 176 appearances. In a cumulative four and a half season spell, he has featured for the club in the Football League, Conference, Play-offs, FA Cup, Football League Cup, Football League Trophy and FA Trophy during his three spells with the club – having been signed twice and loaned once.

Graham Turner stepped down as manager following confirmation of relegation and appointed John Trewick, first team coach for the last 5 seasons, as the new manager for the remaining two matches of the season and beyond.

Pre-season

League One

FA Cup

League Cup

Johnstone's Paint Trophy

Hereford United received a bye to the Second Round

Herefordshire Senior Cup

Westfields won 3–2 on penalties

Squad statistics

Transfers

In

Out

Loan in

Loan out

References

2008–09
2008–09 Football League One by team